School shootings in the United States have occurred at K–12 public and private schools, as well as at colleges and universities, and on school buses. Excluded from this list are the following:
 Incidents that occurred during wars 
 Incidents that occurred as a result of police actions
 Murder-suicides by rejected suitors or estranged spouses
 Suicides or suicide attempts involving only one person.

Shootings by school staff, where the only victims are other employees, are covered at workplace killings.

2000s 
 incidents.

2010s 
 incidents.

2020s 
 incidents.

See also 
 List of school shootings in the United States by death toll
 List of school-related attacks
 Mass shootings in the United States
 List of mass shootings in the United States
List of unsuccessful attacks related to schools

Notes

References

Bibliography

External links 
 School Safety Interim Study Committee – Indiana Legislative Services Agency (September 24, 2013)
 Federal Report Looks at Crime and Safety in Schools – Council for American Private Education (CAPE) (January 2015)
 Indicators of School Crime and Safety: 2014 – National Center for Education Statistics (July 9, 2015)
 Indicators of School Crime and Safety: 2014 – Council of State Governments Justice Center (July 15, 2015)
 Selected Findings from the Indicators of School Crime and Safety: 2014 – Center for Evidence-Based Crime Policy (CEBCP) Symposium (August 17, 2015)

School Shooting incidents.

United States crime-related lists
Secondary education-related lists
United States